William Theodore "Teddy" Bailey (born August 12, 1944) was a college and professional American football player.

References

See also
List of American Football League players

1944 births
Living people
Sportspeople from Hamilton, Ohio
American football running backs
Cincinnati Bearcats football players
Buffalo Bills players
Boston Patriots players
American Football League players